SugarHill Recording Studios is a recording studio in Houston, Texas. The studio was important in launching the careers of such artists as Lightnin' Hopkins, The Big Bopper, George Jones, the Sir Douglas Quintet, Roy Head, and Freddy Fender. It is renowned for its collection of vintage recording equipment, reverb chamber rooms, EMT plates and a long history of music. A landmark in the Houston music community, SugarHill celebrated its 69th year of operation in October 2011.

Founded in October 1941 by Bill Quinn under the name Quinn Recording, it is the oldest continuously operating studio in the United States. In 1950 Quinn changed the name of the studio to Gold Star Studios. Huey P Meaux took control in the early 1970s, and gave the studio its current name.

Incarnations

Quinn/Gold Star Studios

Quinn's Gold Star Records featured country music, then still commonly known as hillbilly music. Recordings of Cajun music also appeared on the label. In his first few years of business, Bill Quinn also recorded radio commercials and birthday greetings. That changed when Gold Star released its first hit record, a song called "Jole Blon" by Harry Choates, a swing and dance tune that became the first and only Cajun record to reach the Billboard Top Five. It is still popular today. The Gold Star label had a string of hits throughout the late-1940s, 50s and 60s including:
	Lightnin' Hopkins: "T-Model Blues" and "Tim Moore's Farm" were both top 10 hits (1948)
	George Jones' first hit "Why Baby Why" (1955)
	Six more George Jones hit singles: "What Am I Worth", "You Gotta Be My Baby", "Just One More", "Yearning", "Too Much Water" and "Don't Stop the Music" (1956)
	The Big Bopper's hit "Chantilly Lace" (1958)
	Johnny Preston's "Running Bear", written by The Big Bopper (1959)
	James O'Gwynn's "Talk to Me Lonesome Heart" and Eddie Noack's "Have Blues Will Travel/The Price of Love" (1959)
	Willie Nelson's first two official hits: "Family Bible" (a song he wrote for Claude Gray) and "Night Life" (1959 & 1960) (Night Life was recorded by Ray Price in 1960).

The early 1960s saw the beginnings of the psychedelic Texas rock era, particularly with the release of Sir Douglas Quintet's hit song "She's About a Mover", and "Treat Her Right" by Roy Head and The Traits (both produced by Huey P. Meaux).

In January 1968, International Artists Record Company leased Gold Star. Coupled with the successes of "Treat Her Right" (#2) and "She's About A Mover" (#13), the studio attracted more psychedelic rock bands including: 13th Floor Elevators, The Red Krayola, The Bubble Puppy, The Continental Five, The Bad Seeds, The Moving Sidewalks (Billy Gibbons' first band) and the Zakary Thaks. BJ Thomas also recorded a portion of his first commercially successful album, Tomorrow Never Comes during that time.

SugarHill (Huey P. Meaux)
The reputation of SugarHill was enhanced when the studio producer Huey P. Meaux took over ownership in the early 1970s. He became instrumental in launching many careers, most notably that of Freddy Fender who recorded 21 hit records including "Before The Next Teardrop Falls",  "Wasted Days and Wasted Nights", "Secret Love", "You'll Lose a Good Thing" and "Living it Down". Throughout the 1970s and 1980s, SugarHill continued to record notable artists including:
	Frieda and The Fire Dogs (now famous blues singer/pianist Marcia Ball) (1972)
	Little Feat recorded their infamous live broadcast on Pacifica's KPFT 90.1FM in 1973.
	Asleep At The Wheel recorded "Miles of Texas" (1976)
	Gubernatorial candidate Kinky Friedman recorded his LP Lasso from El Paso (1976)
	Ricky Nelson & Elvis Presley's guitarist, James Burton (1976)
	Todd Rundgren (1977)
	Ted Nugent (1978)
	Lucinda Williams (1980)
	Jandek (1982)
       Really Red (1984)
	Little Joe y LaFamilia (1984)
	Arnett Cobb and Dizzy Gillespie (1987)

In 1986, Modern Music Ventures Incorporated purchased SugarHill from Huey P. Meaux. SugarHill consequently became the home base for a number of successful Tejano recording artists including Emilio Navaira, La Fiebre, Excellencia, Country Star Johnny Rodriquez and Adalberto Gallegos.

Concurrently, Modern Music Ventures established their own Tejano label called Discos MM and released hit records by Elsa Garcia, Jerry Rodriguez and Mercedes (album Rebelde'' 1990), and The Hometown Boys. Members of influential Australian rock band, Radio Birdman, Deniz Tek and Chris Masuak, arrived in the early 90s to record their solo albums.

SugarHill (RAD Audio)
In 1996, SugarHill underwent another change in ownership: RAD Audio, a company formed by studio engineers Dan Workman, Andy Bradley and Rodney Meyers. With new management and additional studio renovations, SugarHill continued to evolve. SugarHill recorded such artists as Destiny's Child, Robert Minot, Ann-Margret, Solange Knowles, Brian McKnight, Twista, Smash Mouth, Beyoncé, Kelly Rowland, Michelle Williams, Hubert Laws, Clay Walker, Jay Hooks, and Calvin Owens.

"The SugarHill Sessions"
The 2000s ushered in many changes in the music production industry, not the least of which was a massive rise in home recording. In 2006, SugarHill partnered with the Pacifica Radio Network and launched "The SugarHill Sessions," a radio show on Pacifica' Houston affiliate 90.1FM KPFT. The show was created as a platform to encourage local music and to highlight live independent music in the Gulf Coast region. The show has profiled indie artists including Marah (Yep Roc Records), Bring Back The Guns, Ume (Pretty Activity), Jana Hunter (Gnomonsong), Spain Colored Orange (Lucid Records), Todd Snider (Universal) and The Long Winters (Barsuk).

In 2006, SugarHill recorded Frank Black (The Pixies), Johnny Bush, Johnny Nash, Matt Johnson, Southern Backtones, Row Zero, The Medicine Show, Clouseaux, Glenna Bell, John Evans, Jandek, Maggie Walters, The Inoculist, Broadmoore, Def Trapp, IB3, Darrin Love, Anne Loo, Calvin Owens, Trystan Layne, Shei Atkins, and Bullet.

In December 2008, the studio teamed up with Zenfilm and introduced a monthly video podcast, to give the audience a "behind the scenes" glimpse of recording sessions followed by interviews of the artists.

References

External links
 Official site

Recording studios in the United States